Steven John Wilkos (born March 9, 1964) is an American television personality, a veteran of the United States Marine Corps and a former law enforcement officer with the Chicago Police Department. He has been hosting The Steve Wilkos Show since 2007, and was director of security on Jerry Springer from 1994 to 2007. He had previously substituted for Springer as host on several occasions before being given his own talk show.

Early life and education
Born in Chicago, Wilkos grew up in what is now the Roscoe Village neighborhood in North Center, Chicago, and is one of four children. His parents are Jeanette (née Pelikan), a beauty school instructor, and Stanley Wilkos, a former police officer who was in the Korean War as an army paratrooper. He graduated from Lane Technical High School in 1982.

Career

In October 1982, Wilkos joined the United States Marine Corps, serving in South Korea, Japan, Illinois, Virginia, and South Carolina before being discharged in March 1989.

Chicago Police Department
Wilkos joined the Chicago Police Department in 1990, where he was stationed at various times in the Logan Square, Chicago, Humboldt Park, and Near West Side neighborhoods.

Jerry Springer
In May 1994, the producers of Jerry Springer, taped in Chicago at that time, needed security guards, so they decided to hire Wilkos and other off-duty police officers to work part-time for the show. Wilkos recruited several fellow officers for the job, and he retired from the force in 2004 and worked exclusively for the show beginning in 2001.

Entertainment Weekly reported that Wilkos became a professional wrestler with the Maryland Championship Wrestling during a temporary production hiatus of Jerry Springer. In 2005, Wilkos appeared as a guest on Check, Please!, a restaurant-reviewing program on Chicago's PBS station, WTTW. In 2006, after Springer began what would be a seven-episode stint on Dancing with the Stars, Wilkos filled in for him in the meantime and Springer later recruited Wilkos to substitute for him each Monday, calling him "the obvious choice."

Beyond Jerry Springer, he has made cameo appearances on the MLB Network. He's also appeared on TV series Between Brothers, The Wayans Bros. and in the movie Austin Powers: The Spy Who Shagged Me as a security guard for Jerry Springer.

The Steve Wilkos Show

In January 2007, NBC Universal Television officially announced that Wilkos would host a talk show of his own based at NBC Tower in Chicago. The self-titled program premiered on September 10, 2007, and received high ratings. Steve is known for his abrasive approach to solving disputes on his self-titled show, tackling many different issues like child abuse, molestation, and cheating partners.

Wilkos expressed disapproval with the first season of the talk show, as he reflected: "All I did was yell at everybody and throw people off the stage. There was no level of emotion -- just hardcore yelling." Wilkos said this was how he was produced by his original executive producer, but that his wife encouraged him to be himself and go with his "gut."

Like other tabloid talk shows, The Steve Wilkos Show aired primarily on affiliates of Fox, MyNetworkTV and The CW. Only scattered ABC, CBS and NBC affiliates in smaller markets aired it to fill their timeslot. The CW Plus has aired The Steve Wilkos Show since 2007, airing weekdays between 8am-10am.

Personal life
Wilkos was previously married to Rosae Wilkos and Hannah Wilkos. Both marriages ended in divorce.

He married his third wife Rachelle Consiglio, the executive producer for Jerry Springer as well as his own show, in 2000. They have two children. They lived in Park Ridge, Illinois until moving to Darien, Connecticut in 2009 when The Steve Wilkos Show moved production to nearby Stamford. In 2015, Wilkos sold his Park Ridge home for $750,000. Wilkos also owns a summer house in Camp Lake, Wisconsin.

Wilkos identifies as a Republican. In an interview after the 2016 election, Wilkos described candidates Clinton and Trump as "so flawed" and said that they were both "poor" candidates, but said he was "glad" that Trump won.

Car wreck
On January 21, 2018, Wilkos was involved in a rollover crash near his home and was charged with drunk driving. He has asked a judge for an alternative punishment which would result in charges being dismissed upon completion of an education and treatment program.

References

External links

The Steve Wilkos Show Official Website

1964 births
Living people
American male actors
American male bloggers
American bloggers
American male professional wrestlers
American people of British descent
American people of Czech descent
American people of Slovak descent
American people of Polish descent
American television talk show hosts
Chicago Police Department officers
Connecticut Republicans
Illinois Republicans
People from Darien, Connecticut
People from Park Ridge, Illinois
People from Salem Lakes, Wisconsin
Sportspeople from Chicago
United States Marines